Aristagoras was a tyrant of Cyme, and son of Heracleides, one of the Ionian chiefs left by Darius the Great to guard the bridge over the Danube River. On the revolt of the Ionians from Persia, in 500 BCE, Aristagoras was taken by stratagem and delivered up to his fellow citizens, who, however, dismissed him uninjured.

References

6th-century BC rulers
5th-century BC rulers
Aeolians